Chaukhamba is a mountain massif in the Gangotri Group of the Garhwal Himalaya. Its main summit, Chaukhamba I, is the highest peak in the group. It lies at the head of the Gangotri Glacier and forms the eastern anchor of the group. It is located in the northern Indian state of Uttarakhand, west of the Hindu holy town of Badrinath.

After unsuccessful attempts in 1938 and 1939, Chaukhamba I was first climbed on 13 June 1952, by Lucien George and Victor Russenberger (Swiss members of an otherwise French expedition). They ascended the northeast face, from the Bhagirathi-Kharak Glacier. The other members of the expedition were the French alpinist and traveler Marie-Louise Plovier Chapelle and the renown French alpinist and climber Edouard Frendo.

Chaukhamba I is an ultra-prominent peak, with a prominence of more than 1,500m. Mana Pass is the key col for Chaukhamba I.

Photo gallery

See also
 List of Himalayan peaks of Uttarakhand

References

External links

 
 

Geography of Uttarkashi district
Mountains of Uttarakhand